Lionair Flight 602 was a Lionair Antonov An-24RV which crashed into the sea off the north-western coast of Sri Lanka on 29 September 1998. The aircraft departed Jaffna Airport with 48 passengers and a crew of seven; it disappeared from radar screens ten minutes into the flight. Initial reports indicated that the plane had been shot down by the Liberation Tigers of Tamil Eelam using a MANPADS, which has since been confirmed. All aboard were presumed killed.

Aircraft and crew
The Antonov AN-24RV was leased from Belarusian company Gomelavia to operate flight 602. It was captained by Anatoli Matochko and had six other crew including a Sinhalese stewardess. There were 48 passengers, all Tamils, including 17 females and 8 children.

Crash
The aircraft went missing ten minutes after taking off from Jaffna Airport at 13:40 on 29 September 1998 on a scheduled flight to Colombo; all those aboard were presumed killed. The pilot reported depressurisation a short time before contact was lost. Following the downing of Flight LN 602 all civil aviation between Colombo and Jaffna was suspended for many months by the Sri Lanka Civil Aviation Authority.

Pre-crash warnings
Lionair, the main operator of Colombo-Jaffna flights, received a warning letter a month before the incident from the Tamil Eelam Administrative Service, stating that if the airline continued to ignore a prior warning about carrying Sri Lanka Armed Forces personnel, it would be attacked after 14 September. The airline closed its office in Jaffna four days before the incident.

Investigation
In October 2012 the Sri Lankan Navy discovered wreckage which was believed to be the disintegrated parts of the missing Antonov on the sea bed off Iranaitivu Island. Information concerning the crash site was gained from a former LTTE cadre who had left Sri Lanka and was arrested on his return by the Police Terrorist Investigation Department. He confessed to having fired a missile at the aircraft from the island on the orders of Poththu Amman, a leading member of the LTTE.

The Navy salvaged the first pieces of the wreckage in May 2013, nearly 15 years after the event. Clothing and remains from 22 victims recovered in the salvage operation were put on display in Jaffna for identification in January 2014.

See also 
 Malaysia Airlines Flight 17
 Korean Air Lines Flight 007
 Air Lanka Flight 512 
 Air Ceylon Avro 748 4R-ACJ bombing

References 

Airliner shootdown incidents
Attacks on civilians attributed to the Liberation Tigers of Tamil Eelam
Aviation accidents and incidents in 1998
Liberation Tigers of Tamil Eelam attacks in Eelam War III
Mass murder in 1998
Terrorist incidents in Sri Lanka in 1998
20th-century aircraft shootdown incidents
September 1998 events in Asia
Liberation Tigers of Tamil Eelam attacks against airliners
Accidents and incidents involving the Antonov An-24